Crambodoxa is a genus of moths in the family Gelechiidae. It contains the species Crambodoxa platyaula, which is found in Colombia.

The wingspan is about 23 mm. The forewings are brownish, the dorsum and anterior half of the costa suffused with darker brown and with a broad silvery-white supra-median streak from the base to the apex, edged beneath with blackish-brown, the lower edge angular-prominent in the middle, where a streak of blackish-brown suffusion runs to the tornus. The hindwings are grey.

References

Gelechiinae
Taxa named by Edward Meyrick
Moth genera